The 1939 Kentucky Derby was the 65th running of the Kentucky Derby. The race took place on May 6, 1939.

Full results

 Winning breeder: Claiborne Farm (KY)

References

1939
Kentucky Derby
Derby